The Communist Party of Finland (SKP , FKP) or New Communist Party of Finland (USKP , FNKP) is a political party in Finland. It was founded in the mid-1980s as Communist Party of Finland (Unity) (SKPy,  FKP(e)) by the former opposition of the old Communist Party of Finland (1918–1992). SKP has never been represented in the Finnish parliament, but the party has had local councillors in some municipalities, including the city councils of major cities such as Helsinki and Tampere. SKP claims 2,500 members.

The party has been officially registered since 1997. In the 1980s, when the opposition and the organizations it controlled were expelled from the SKP led by Arvo Aalto, the SKPy, however, chose not to register since they considered themselves the real SKP and claimed Aalto had illegally stolen the party. The courts later ruled all the expulsions illegal.

History

The opposition inside SKP
The internal conflict of Finnish communists began in the mid-1960s, when the party led by the new chairman Aarne Saarinen, began to modernize the party line / outlook. A minority of the party cadre didn't accept this and they accused the SKP leadership of being revisionist. SKP didn't break up in the 1960s and the party was formally united until the mid-1980s. After the 20th party congress in 1984 things, however, changed as Arvo Aalto was elected chairman, after which the opposition did not participate in (or was left out of) the SKP central committee. The opposition, which was also known as “taistoists”, called supporters of Aalto “axe liners”.

The founding of SKPy
The central committee of the SKP expelled eight opposition district organizations from the party 13 October 1985. Also, 494 other basic organizations and 17 city or regional organizations were expelled 13 June 1986, which the expelled then dubbed “Black Friday”. The opposition considered the actions to be against the law. They took the conflict to courts and because of minor technicalities Helsingin Hovioikeus court overruled SKP's decision 11 June 1987. SKP then re-expelled these same organizations in its 21st party congress (12–14 June 1987). However, a week before this happened, the newly founded SKP (Unity) held its own “21st” party congress. The ambiguities in the expelling process and the opposition's firm belief in its own cause gave it the justification it needed and they considered SKPy to be the real SKP. They claimed Aalto had illegally seized the party with “paper members”. SKPy was never taken to the official party register of Finland as the party considered that to have been voluntary resignation and admission of SKPy not being the real SKP.

April 26, 1986 a meeting of "the representatives of SKP organizations" was held in Tampere and those present elected a new central committee. The leader of the new central committee was Taisto Sinisalo, former vice chairman of the SKP and the most well-known figure of the opposition, who already had led Committee of SKP Organizations founded in November 1985. In the SKPy's 21st party congress Sinisalo was re-elected. Yrjö Hakanen and Marja-Liisa Löyttyjärvi became the vice chairmen while the former SKP chairman Jouko Kajanoja was elected party secretary. In his congress speech, Sinisalo told that the suffix “unity” meant “strong intention to gather all the forces of the SKP”. The congress, however, also was heading to future and building of a new party, or “rebuilding” as they thought it. Before the name SKPy was adopted the party was known in media as the unity or Tiedonantaja group.

SKP and the Soviet Union
SKPy was very committed to the Soviet Union and the political line of its Communist Party (CPSU), which was going through great changes during Gorbachev's time. SKPy supported perestroika but criticized those who claimed to have been "Gorbachevist" even before Gorbachev's time. SKPy claimed SKP to be anti-SU and tried to give the Finnish people as positive a picture as possible of that country. When SKP split the monetary support from Soviet Union was halted and, for example, the very profitable publishing deals of the SKP had gone to SKPy. Gorbachev's CPSU, however, had relations with both parties.

KTP splits from SKPy
In the late 1970s the opposition of SKP began to split as those supporting a more traditional version of Marxism-Leninism began to criticize opposition leaders. When it was decided that SKPy would not be registered as an official party, some communists protested and demanded registration. They thought SKPy was clinging to the unity slogan in a situation in which it no longer seemed realistic. In the 1987 party congress, these people were warned by the SKPy leadership but they chose to ignore the advice and oriented themselves toward founding a new party. For Peace and Socialism - Communist Workers Party (Kommunistinen Työväenpuolue – Rauhan ja Sosialismin puolesta, KTP) was founded early in the year 1988. Founders of KTP felt to be securing the existence of a Marxist-Leninist party in Finland while criticizing SKPy for being revisionist and supporting Mikhail Gorbachev. The most famous figure in the new party was probably Markus Kainulainen, a longtime SKP district secretary of Uusimaa and a former MP.

The founding of Left Alliance
Esko-Juhani Tennilä, a member of the Parliament of Finland, was elected new chairman of SKPy 22 October 1989 when Kajanoja decided to resign while strongly criticizing his comrades. Tennilä has later told he took the job to secure that the founding of a new united left party would not be sabotaged by his own party comrades many of which were quite critical of it. The Left Alliance (Vasemmistoliitto) was founded in spring 1990 and members of SKPy and its electoral front Deva also joined even though prejudices were very high on both sides at this point.

Dispute over double membership
Members of the Left Alliance (LA) disliked that many of their members were also members of the SKPy. It was thus decided that SKPy members couldn't participate in the LA's electoral lists, even though they could be members. Because of this, Tennilä also had to quit his job as party chairman when joining LA group in parliament. Yrjö Hakanen was chosen Tennilä's successor. The dispute over double membership, as it was called, led to many SKPy members leaving LA and relations between the two parties got even colder. On the other hand, many former SKPy members were actively participating in LA.

The “new” SKP
In its 1993 party congress (August 28–29) SKPy oriented towards founding a new officially registered communist party and drafting of a new party program. A new party logo was also introduced to mark renewal. It was suggested that a congress to continue SKP's work should be held and that happened next year (November 26–27). In the congress the suffix “unity” was dropped from the name as SKPy now considered to consist of all those comrades who wanted to have an independent communist party. An athletic club was made the basis of new organization and renamed SKP. The decision split the party as some supporters would have preferred SKP to have a lesser role as “Marxist forum” of some kind. Leadership of Left Alliance was also not pleased with those plans. SKP would have wanted to stay inside LA but that wasn't possible and the parties split in the spring of 1994. SKP wasn't however “re-registered” until 1997. There was some confusion, as the new SKP didn't accept responsibility for debts of the old one, which had gone bankrupt.

Organization

SKP has a nationwide organization consisting of 14 district organizations. The central committee has 41 members and the politbyro 10. The organ of SKP is Tiedonantaja, which was founded in the 1960s. Tiedonantaja was also the organ of Deva during 1986–1990. The editor-in-chief is Marko Korvela since 2012. SKP also has some local papers.

As the SKPy considered itself to be the real SKP it also had the same organizational structure. It was based on Leninist principle of democratic centralism and the party rules of 1958 (modified in 1978).

Deva – SKPy's electoral front
While SKPy was never officially registered, its supporters founded an electoral front Democratic Alternative (Deva). Those MPs of Finnish People's Democratic League (SKDL, a front organization dominated by SKP) who were against expulsions were expelled from SKDL and they found the parliament group of Deva. Deva was SKPy's SKDL and it was supposed to attract some democratic allies. The small Socialist Workers Party (STP) didn't join Deva but it had members on the DEVA list. Young supporters of SKPy and Deva founded Revolutionary Youth League (VKN) which was Deva's youth organization. SKDL's Socialist Student League (SOL) also joined. Deva was led by actress Kristiina Halkola.

In 1987 parliamentary elections Deva got 4.3% of votes and four MPs. In 1988 presidential elections Deva candidate Jouko Kajanoja got under 2 per cent of the votes. Not even all members of SKPy supported Kajanoja who was the party chairman. Deva was closed down in 1990 after Left Alliance was founded and most of its members joined the new party.

Party congresses

Elections

Electoral results

Parliament

European Parliament

The SKP participates in parliamentary, European Parliament and municipal elections. The party has not put up candidates in recent presidential elections. No national representatives has been elected from the SKP lists but the party has a few local councillors. The SKP also participates in trade union and cooperative elections.

The SKP first took part in parliamentary elections in 1999. The party had electoral alliances with small parties of Muutos 99 coalition. It was the first time the Finnish electorate had an opportunity to vote for a list named Communist Party of Finland. In 2003 the vote-puller for the party was rock musician Kari Peitsamo (1 803 votes) and in 2007 rap artist Seppo "Steen1" Lampela (1 842).

In the local elections the SKP has had elected councillors in about ten different municipalities. The party has got its strongest support in Nokia, where there are three SKP councillors. Communists also briefly had three councillors in the Jyväskylä city council until early 2008.

The SKP has made electoral coalitions with other small parties, especially the Communist Workers Party (KTP). Communist League members were on SKP lists before they in 2006 founded the Workers Party of Finland (STP). The SKP condemned the STP for scattering communist forces. The parties have made some limited electoral cooperation since. The Left Alliance has never been interested in coalitions with the communists, although the parties have had coalitions in few municipalities.

The former SKP chairman Yrjö Hakanen is an elected member of HOK-Elanto cooperative council since 1999. The SKP represented joint list with the KTP.

See also
Communist Youth League (Finland)
List of Communist Party (Finland) breakaway parties

References

External links

 
Tiedonantaja 
  The Programme of the Communist Party of Finland (2007) at Finnish Social Science Data Archive

1984 establishments in Finland
Communist parties in Finland
Party of the European Left member parties
Political parties established in 1984
Political schisms
Registered political parties in Finland
International Meeting of Communist and Workers Parties